John Joseph Dwyer (January 15, 1927 – October 15, 1997) was an American football defensive back in the National Football League for the Washington Redskins and the Los Angeles Rams.  He played college football at Loyola Marymount University and was drafted in the fifth round of the 1951 NFL Draft by the Philadelphia Eagles.

1927 births
1997 deaths
Players of American football from Los Angeles
American football defensive backs
Washington Redskins players
Los Angeles Rams players
Loyola Marymount University alumni